Madirovalo is a town and commune in Madagascar. It belongs to the district of Ambato-Boeni, which is a part of Boeny Region. The population of the commune was estimated to be approximately 66,000 in 2001 commune census.

Madirovalo has a riverine harbour. Primary and junior level secondary education are available in town. The town provides access to hospital services to its citizens.

The majority 85% of the population of the commune are farmers, while an additional 8% receives their livelihood from raising livestock. The most important crop is rice, while other important products are peanuts, maize and sweet potatoes.  Services provide employment for 2% of the population. Additionally fishing employs 5% of the population.

References and notes 

Populated places in Boeny